Charles Alvin Weatherbie (born January 17, 1955) is an American former gridiron football player and coach. He served as the head football coach at Utah State University (1992–1994), the United States Naval Academy (1995–2001), and Louisiana Monroe (2003–2009). In 17 seasons as a college football head coach, he compiled a 76–115 record, including victories in the 1993 Las Vegas Bowl , the 1996 Aloha Bowl, and a 2007 victory over Nick Saban in Tuscaloosa at Bryant–Denny Stadium. Prior to being released by Louisiana–Monroe on November 30, 2009, he led the Warhawks to a third-place finish in the Sun Belt Conference and the second non-losing record since the program moved to the Football Bowl Subdivision in 1993.

Head coaching record

References

External links
 Just Sports Stats

1955 births
Living people
American football quarterbacks
Air Force Falcons football coaches
Arkansas Razorbacks football coaches
Canadian football quarterbacks
American players of Canadian football
Ottawa Rough Riders players
Hamilton Tiger-Cats players
Louisiana–Monroe Warhawks football coaches
Navy Midshipmen football coaches
Oklahoma State Cowboys football coaches
Oklahoma State Cowboys football players
Utah State Aggies football coaches
Wyoming Cowboys football coaches
High school football coaches in Oklahoma
People from Sedan, Kansas